Chez Nous is a Canadian children's television series which aired on CBC Television in 1957.

Premise
Alan Mills and Hélène Baillargeon hosted this English and French language children's series.

Chez Jacques
This series was originally planned as Chez Jacques with host and folk singer Jacques Labrecque. He hosted one episode on 7 October 1957, but two weeks later the series was abruptly renamed Chez Nous where Labrecque was replaced by Baillargeon and Mills.

Scheduling
This half-hour series was broadcast on alternate Mondays at 5:00 p.m. (North American Eastern time) from 21 October to 30 December 1957. The Golden Age Players was broadcast in the time slot on other weeks.

References

External links
 

CBC Television original programming
1950s Canadian children's television series
1957 Canadian television series debuts
1957 Canadian television series endings
Black-and-white Canadian television shows